This is a list of areas and suburbs of Bournemouth, Christchurch and Poole, Dorset, England.

List

Bournemouth 

 Bear Cross
 Boscombe
Bournemouth Town Centre
 Bournemouth University
 Charminster
 East Cliff
 East Howe
 Ensbury Park
 Hengistbury Head
 Holdenhurst
 Iford
 Kings Park
 Kinson
Knighton Heath
 Lansdowne
 Littledown
Mayfield Park
Meyrick Park
 Moordown
 Muccleshell
 Muscliff
 Northbourne
 Pokesdown
 Queen's Park
 Redhill
 Slades Farm
 Southbourne
 Springbourne
 Strouden Park
Talbot Heath
 Talbot Village
 Talbot Woods
 Throop
 Townsend
 Tuckton
 Turbary Park
 Victoria Park
 Wallisdown
 Warren Hill
 Westbourne
 West Cliff
 West Howe
 Wick
 Winton
 Withybed Wood
Woodbury

Christchurch 

 Avon Beach
Blackwater
 Burton
Christchurch Town Centre
 Fairmile
 Friars Cliff
 Highcliffe
 Hoburne Park
 Hurn
 Jumpers Common
 Mudeford
 Portfield
 Purewell
 Somerford
 Stanpit
Walkford
Winkton

Poole 

 Alder Hills
 Alderney
Alexandra Park
 Ashington
Ashley Cross
Baiter Park
 Bearwood
 Branksome
 Branksome Park
 Broadstone
 Canford Cliffs
 Canford Heath
 Canford Magna
County Gates
 Creekmoor
Evening Hill
 Fleetsbridge
 Hamworthy
Holes Bay
 Lilliput
 Longfleet
 Merley
 Oakley
 Newtown
 Oakdale
 Parkstone
 Penn Hill
Poole Harbour
Poole Park
Poole Town Centre
Rockley Park
Rossmore
Salterns Marina
 Sandbanks
Sea View
Stanley Green
 Sterte
 Talbot Village
Turlin Moor
 Wallisdown
 Waterloo
 Whitecliff

References

See also 

 List of civil parishes in Dorset

Bournemouth, Christchurch and Poole
Dorset-related lists
Lists of places in England
Areas of Bournemouth
Areas of Poole
Lists of suburbs of UK towns and cities